Handknattleiksfélag Kópavogs (HK) or HK Iceland is an Icelandic sports club from the town of Kópavogur, mainly known for its football and handball teams. The club has a football team playing in the top tier of Icelandic football.

History
The club dates back to 1969, but was officially established on 26 January 1970. They were originally only a handball team, with the football team established in 1992. They bounced around in lower divisions until, in the summer of 2007 they first played in the Icelandic top division, the Úrvalsdeild. The club were relegated in their second season to the second tier and were again relegated to the third tier in 2011. They are, however, back in the top tier, and placed 9th out of 12 in the 2019 Úrvalsdeild.

Men's football

Achievements
 2. deild karla (3): 1997, 2002, 2013
 3. deild karla (2): 1992, 2001

Current squad

External links
Handknattleiksfélag Kópavogs – Official website

Football clubs in Iceland
Kópavogur
Association football clubs established in 1970
1970 establishments in Iceland